John Eliot Howard (11 December 1807 – 22 November 1883)  was an English chemist of the nineteenth century, who conducted pioneering work with the development of quinine.

Howard was born in Plaistow, Essex, the son of Luke Howard a noted Quaker meteorologist and chemist. He worked at the family pharmaceutical manufacturing business of Howards and Sons. He was elected a Fellow of the Royal Society in June 1874.

He was the author of scientific works including The Quinology of the East Indian Plantations (1869–1876), religious works including a commentary on the book of Hebrews and histories including The Island Of The Saints, about the Reformation in Ireland.

Howard was originally a Quaker, but became connected with Christians meeting at the new Brooks Street Meeting House in Tottenham, now Brook Street Chapel, which was founded in 1838–1839 by a number of other Christians including Howard's brother Robert; his father Luke (the 'namer of clouds') helped to finance the building of the chapel: a portrait of the father and son hangs in the National Portrait Gallery.

Howard married Maria Crewdson on 9 September 1830 and the couple had nine children, including Joseph Howard, who was later Liberal MP for Tottenham. The family lived at Lord's Meade, Lordship Lane, Tottenham. Howard died in Edmonton, London at the age of 76 and is buried in Tottenham Cemetery. One of his grandchildren was the ornithologist, Henry Eliot Howard.

The genus Howardia of the Rubiaceae was dedicated to him.

References

1807 births
1883 deaths
People from Plaistow, Newham
19th-century English people
19th-century chemists
English chemists
Quinine
British Plymouth Brethren
Fellows of the Royal Society